Josh Begley may refer to:
 Josh Begley (artist)
 Josh Begley (footballer)